Hamid Tavakkol (born 25 October 1933) is a retired Iranian freestyle wrestler who won a bronze medal at the 1961 World Championships. 

Tavakol graduated in French Literature from the University of Tehran and can communicate in French, English and Turkish. After retiring from competitions he had a long career as a sports administrator. He is married and has four children. He lives in Mashhad.

References

1933 births
Living people
Iranian male sport wrestlers
World Wrestling Championships medalists
20th-century Iranian people